Prakash Raj (born Prakash Rai; 26 March 1965) is an Indian actor, film director, producer, television presenter, and politician. Known for his works in Tamil, Telugu, Kannada, Malayalam, and Hindi-language films, he is the recipient of several accolades, including five National Film Awards, eight Nandi Awards, eight Tamil Nadu State Film Awards, five Filmfare Awards South, four SIIMA Awards, three CineMAA Awards, and three Vijay Awards. Apart from his mother tongue Kannada, Raj's fluency in Telugu, Tamil, Malayalam, Hindi, English, Tulu and Marathi has placed him among the most sought after actors in Indian cinema.

After working in stage shows and television in Kannada for a few years, Raj ventured into films. He made his debut in Tamil cinema through Duet (1994), by K. Balachander, and has since been a commercially successful film star in Tamil. In remembrance, he named his production company Duet Movies. 

A polyglot, he played a variety of roles, most notably as the antagonist and, of late, as a character actor. Prakash, as an actor has won a National Film Award for Best Supporting Actor in 1998 for Mani Ratnam's Iruvar, a National Film Award – Special Mention for the Telugu film Antahpuram, directed by Krishna Vamsi in 1998 and a National Film Award for Best Actor in 2007 for his role in Kanchivaram, a Tamil film directed by Priyadarshan.

As a producer, he has won a National Film Award for Best Feature Film in Kannada for Puttakkana Highway, directed by his long-time theatre friend B. Suresha in 2011. Prakash was also the host of Neengalum Vellalam Oru Kodi during the show's second season.

Personal life
Prakash Raj was born in Bangalore on 26 March 1965 to a Tuluva father and a Kannada mother.

His brother is Prasad Raj, who is also an actor. He completed schooling at St. Joseph's Indian High School and joined St. Joseph's College of Commerce, Bangalore. Actress Geetha introduced Prakash Raj to prominent Tamil film director K. Balachander. Prakash Raj changed his surname from 'Rai' to 'Raj' upon K. Balachander's advice; he is still called Prakash Rai in his home state, Karnataka.

Prakash Raj married actress Lalitha Kumari in 1994. They had two daughters, Meghana and Pooja, and a son, Sidhu who died in 2004. The couple divorced in 2009.

Later, he married choreographer Pony Verma on 24 August 2010. They have a son, Vedhanth born in 2015.

Prakash Raj was brought up as a Roman Catholic but now identifies as an atheist.

Film career

As an actor

Prakash Raj acted in back-to-back stage shows for 300 a month in the initial stages of his career, when he joined Kalakshetra, Bengaluru, and he has 2,000 street theatre performances to his credit.

Prakash began his television career with Doordarshan serials such as Bisilu Kudure (Kannada) and Guddada Bhootha (Tulu and Kannada). He later took up supporting roles in Kannada films such as Ramachari, Ranadheera, Nishkarsha and Lockup Death. He was noticed for his dialogue delivery and histrionics. His breakthrough role came in Harakeya Kuri, directed by K. S. L. Swamy starring Vishnuvardhan, with whom he had acted in other films such as Mithileya Seetheyaru, Muthina Haara and Nishkarsha. His performance was noticed by Geetha, the lead heroine of the film, who introduced Prakash to her mentor K. Balachander, a Tamil director. He acted under the screen name "Prakash Rai" in Kannada films and was given the name "Prakash Raj" by K. Balachander for his debut Tamil film Duet, which saw him playing his first major role.

Prakash re-entered Kannada films through Nagamandala in 1997, directed by T. S. Nagabharana, which was selected for the Indian Panorama in the International Film Festival in 1997. He was also a part of Mani Ratnam's stage show Netru, Indru, Naalai. In 1997, he acted in Mani Ratnam's biopic Iruvar. The movie dealt with the relationship between politicians M. G. Ramachandran and M. Karunanidhi, for which he won the National Film Award for Best Supporting Actor.

He starred in many Malayalam films in 1996: The Prince, Indraprastham and Oru Yathramozhi, the last of which released in 1997. He also acted in Pandippada, with Dilip in 2005, Thekkekara Superfast in 2003, Keerthichakra in 2006, Amal Neerad's Anwar and Shyamaprasad's sensational movie Elecktra in 2010. For most of his Mollywood movies, he will render his own voice. He was also seen in the movie Achayans along with Jayaram.

He acted in many Telugu films, including Antahpuram (1998), which earned him a National Film Award – Special Jury Award / Special Mention.

He played an important role in Venkat Prabhu's Saroja. In 2008, he produced a film titled Abhiyum Naanum and played an important character in it. He remade the movie in Kannada as Naanu Nanna Kanasu.

Prakash Raj also acted in a 2004-released multi starrer hit film Khakee along with Amithabh Bachchan, Aishwarya Rai, Ajay Devgn, Akshay Kumar & Tushar Kapoor, playing Assistant Commissioner of Police Shrikant Naidu, Angre's main mole in the police force. Since Wanted (2009), Prakash Raj has been a regular villain in Hindi language Bollywood movies, including Singham, Dabangg 2, Mumbai Mirror (2013), and Policegiri.

He acted with actor Kamal Haasan in Vasool Raja MBBS, which was a critical and commercial success. Then, he paired again with Kamal Haasan in Thoongaa Vanam (2015). He acted in the Telugu movie Bharat Ane Nenu (2018). He will be seen in Major, which is directed by Sashi Kiran Tikka.

As a director
Prakash took on the mantle of director with Naanu Nanna Kanasu, in Kannada in 2010, for which he was the joint producer. The film completed 125 days successfully in the theatres across Karnataka, becoming the biggest hit of the year. He was nominated for the Filmfare South "Best Director" category for his first film.

He then directed the Telugu and Tamil bilingual film Dhoni. In 2014, he directed the multilingual film Oggarane (in Kannada), Ulavacharu Biryani (in Telugu) and Un Samayal Arayil (in Tamil). Although the Tamil and Telugu versions did not do any miracles at the box office, the Kannada version became the runaway blockbuster hit of the year.

As a film producer
Prakash became a film producer beginning with the Tamil film Dhaya (2002), in which he starred with actress Meena. It earned him a Special Jury National Award for his performance. He later produced films in Tamil such as Naam (2003), Azhagiya Theeye (2004), Kanda Naal Mudhal (2005), Poi (2006), Mozhi (2007), Velli Thirai and Abhiyum Naanum, which won many Tamil Nadu State Awards in 2008, and Inidhu Inidhu in 2010.

The first non-Tamil film that he produced was his directorial debut in Kannada, Naanu Nanna Kanasu, a remake of his own Tamil production Abhiyum Naanum, for which he was the joint producer, along with his long-time Bengaluru theatre friend, Kannada director-producer B. Suresha. In 2011, he acted and jointly produced the Kannada film Puttakkana Highway, again with Suresh, who directed the film. It was a milestone in Prakash's production career since Puttakkana Highway won him the National Award for Best Regional Film for the year 2010–2011, and an award in the fourth Bengaluru International Film Festival of 2011.

In 2011, he produced the Tamil version of the Tamil-Telugu bilingual Payanam in 2011, starring Nagarjuna Akkineni and himself. In 2012, he produced two Tamil films; Mayilu and Dhoni. In 2013, he produced a Telugu-Tamil bilingual film; Gouravam. He produced a multilingual film Oggarane (Kannada), Ulavacharu Biryani (Telugu) and Un Samayal Arayil (Tamil) in 2014. Oggarane became a huge blockbuster hit that year.

Humanitarian work
Prakash Raj adopted the villages of Kondareddypalle in Mahabubnagar District, Telangana state
and Bandlarahatti in Chitradurga district, Karnataka state.

Awards

Political career
Prakash Raj started his active political movement with the hashtag #justasking on social media after his friend Gauri Lankesh's assassination incident in September 2017.

He contested in the 2019 Indian general election as an independent candidate for the Bengaluru Central Lok Sabha constituency. Raj lost the election, securing around 28,906 Votes (2.41%) in the election.

Controversies
Prakash has been involved in several controversies.

He was banned by Telugu film producers six times in the past. Prakash reacted to this by saying:
"If people who work with me say that I play hide and seek, why do they repeat me? Why am I in Mahesh's nine films out of his ten. Why don't you judge me with my work? How I go about it is not important. I don't go by the rules. I put my foot down, I don't take mediocrity. There are certain locations where I can come only at 12 in the morning. I don't go by the rules." It was the first time that an actor was banned by the Telugu industry. Telugu film industry insiders interpret the ban as a conspiracy by several big heroes and producers. Problems started during the shooting of the Telugu films Pawan Kalyan's Jalsa, NTR Jr's Kantri, and Allu Arjun's Parugu.

There was controversy for his naked appearance in a sequence in his latest Telugu release Ongole Githa. The film got an "A Certificate" from the Censor Board. Prakash reacted by saying: "I did not shed my clothes for creating sensation, I had no plans to star in that sequence. The script demanded it; as an actor, I have to abide by the script. Director Bhaskar told me that it would be an 'important' sequence in the context of the film and I just carried out his instructions."

Several Kannada organisations staged protests in front of theatres since they felt that some of the dialogue in a scene in the Hindi film Singham, starring Ajay Devgan and Prakash were derogatory against the Kannadigas. The Karnataka Film Chamber of Commerce (KFCC) had demanded the deletion of all "objectionable" dialogue from the movie. The screening was stopped in major centres of Karnataka. The controversial scene starts off with Prakash threatening Ajay that he would bring 1,000 people from the Karnataka border to thrash him. Ajay (who plays Bajirao Singham, a Maratha), retorts that one lion would suffice to shoo away a thousand dogs. The controversy assumes significance in the backdrop of the decades-old border dispute between Karnataka and Maharashtra. Kannada protesters also felt that Prakash, being a Kannadiga should have told the team that it is not right. Prakash reacted to it to the Kannada and the Telugu media by saying: "I am a Kannadiga myself and I love my mother tongue Kannada. I'm very proud of my community and would never deliberately do anything to hurt my people. How would I allow conversations that provide pain to people of Karnataka in any movie in which I am cast? There is nothing controversial about the dialogue. I am a Maratha in the movie, the controversy has started just because I am a Kannadiga and I used the word 'Karnataka border' in the film because the villain in the film stays in Goa, the Karnataka border." Finally the dialogue was removed, and the whole team of Singham including the director Rohit Shetty, the production house "Reliance Big Entertainment", and Prakash apologized to all the Kannadigas; the issue was resolved.

References

External links

 

1965 births
Living people
Tulu people
Mangaloreans
Male actors in Kannada cinema
Male actors in Tamil cinema
Male actors in Malayalam cinema
Male actors in Hindi cinema
Indian male film actors
Film producers from Bangalore
Tamil film producers
Kannada film directors
Tamil film directors
Telugu film directors
Tamil male television actors
Tamil television presenters
Indian male television actors
Tamil Nadu State Film Awards winners
Filmfare Awards South winners
Best Actor National Film Award winners
Best Supporting Actor National Film Award winners
Nandi Award winners
International Tamil Film Award winners
Film directors from Bangalore
Male actors from Bangalore
20th-century Indian male actors
21st-century Indian male actors
Male actors in Kannada television
South Indian International Movie Awards winners
Special Jury Award (feature film) National Film Award winners
Special Mention (feature film) National Film Award winners
International Indian Film Academy Awards winners
Zee Cine Awards winners
Indian actor-politicians
Independent politicians in India
Male actors in Telugu cinema
Indian atheists